The Museum of Broadway, on West 45th Street in Times Square, is the first permanent museum dedicated to documenting the history and experience of Broadway theatre and its profound influence upon shaping Midtown Manhattan and Times Square. The museum covers more than three hundred years of Broadway history, including costumes and props from more than 500 productions. The Museum of Broadway was founded in collaboration with Playbill, Broadway Cares/Equity Fights AIDS, the Billy Rose Theatre Division at the New York Public Library for the Performing Arts, the Al Hirschfeld Foundation, Goodspeed Musicals, Creative Goods, and Concord Theatricals.

The museum opened on November 15, 2022. It was originally scheduled to open in 2020, but its construction and development were delayed by the COVID-19 pandemic.
The  museum comprises three sections: The Map Room, featuring a short film that outlines the history of theater in New York and the location of the extant theatres, a two-floor Broadway timeline, and the Making of a Broadway Show.

References

External links
  

Theatre museums in the United States
Museums in Manhattan
Museums established in 2022
Museum